Ryan Christensen (born 12 September 1996) is a New Zealand professional racing cyclist, who currently rides for UCI ProTeam .

Major results

2015
 10th The REV Classic
2016
 1st  Points classification New Zealand Cycle Classic
2018
 5th Overall Tour of Quanzhou Bay
2019
 2nd Gravel and Tar
 7th Slag om Norg
 7th Schaal Sels
2021
 3rd Road race, National Road Championships
 3rd Gravel and Tar Classic
 8th Overall New Zealand Cycle Classic
2022
 1st Stage 1 (TTT) New Zealand Cycle Classic
 4th Road race, National Road Championships
 4th Overall Course de Solidarność et des Champions Olympiques
 4th Gylne Gutuer
 5th Overall Tour d'Eure-et-Loir
1st  Fair play classification
2023
 2nd Road race, National Road Championships

References

External links

1996 births
Living people
New Zealand male cyclists
Place of birth missing (living people)